Kevin Peter Hall (May 9, 1955 – April 10, 1991) was an American actor. He was the original title character in the science fiction Predator franchise, appearing in the first 1987 film and its 1990 sequel. Hall also portrayed the eponymous Harry in the fantasy comedy film Harry and the Hendersons (1987), a role he reprised for the first season of NBC's television adaptation (1990–1991). His human roles included Dr. Elvin "El" Lincoln on the NBC science fiction series Misfits of Science (1985–1986) and Warren Merriwether on the sitcom 227 (1989–1990).

Early life 
Hall was born in Pittsburgh, Pennsylvania. Hall came from a tall family.

During his high school years at Penn Hills High School, he was a star basketball player. He subsequently attended George Washington University in Washington, D.C., where he played for its basketball team and majored in Theatrical Arts.

After graduation, Hall moved to Venezuela to play professional basketball.

Career 
Due to Hall's height, he was often cast in monster roles. He made his acting debut in the 1979 horror film Prophecy. He appeared as the alien in the 1980 horror film Without Warning and as Gorvil in the 1982 television movie Mazes and Monsters. In 1985, he co-starred in the short-lived series Misfits of Science. The next year, Hall portrayed yet another monster in the horror film Monster in the Closet, followed by the role of Harry, the Bigfoot, in Harry and the Hendersons.

In 1986, Hall was cast as the main antagonist in Predator, opposite Arnold Schwarzenegger. During its developmental stages, the Predator was going to be played by Jean-Claude Van Damme, who played the Predator for the first few scenes, but was uncredited in the end credits. The producers decided to recast the role with Hall so that the Predator could more convincingly dominate the film's human characters with its greater size. Hall also appeared unmasked as a helicopter pilot at the end of the film. Hall would go on to reprise the role in the 1990 sequel, this time opposite Danny Glover and Gary Busey.

Following his role in Predator, Hall appeared in the feature film Big Top Pee-wee (1988) and had a guest spot on Star Trek: The Next Generation; Hall had been one of the actors considered for the role of Geordi La Forge on the latter, before the role went to LeVar Burton. From 1989 to 1990, he had a recurring role on the NBC sitcom 227. In 1990, Hall reprised his role as Harry in the television series Harry and the Hendersons, based on the 1987 film of the same name. He died during the series' first season.

Personal life and death
Hall met actress Alaina Reed while taping a guest role on the television show 227. The couple would marry both on the show and in real life.

While working on the TV series Harry and the Hendersons, Hall announced that he had contracted HIV from a blood transfusion during surgery for injuries he sustained in a car accident. He died from AIDS-related pneumonia on April 10, 1991, a month short of his 36th birthday.

Honors
Hall was posthumously inducted into the Penn Hills Hall of Fame as part of the inaugural class on May 8, 2009.

Filmography

See also
 List of tallest people

References

External links

Sports Reference College Basketball stats

1955 births
1991 deaths
20th-century American male actors
African-American male actors
AIDS-related deaths in California
American expatriate basketball people in Venezuela
American male film actors
American male television actors
American men's basketball players
Basketball players from Pittsburgh
Deaths from pneumonia in California
George Washington Colonials men's basketball players
George Washington University alumni
Male actors from Pittsburgh